Júnior Jesús Padilla Zelaya (born 4 April 1992) is a  Honduran footballer who plays as midfielder for C.D. Victoria in the Honduran Liga Nacional.

References

1992 births
Living people
People from San Pedro Sula
Honduran footballers
Association football midfielders
F.C. Motagua players
Lobos UPNFM players
Liga Nacional de Fútbol Profesional de Honduras players